Tony Ridnell (born  Jan 1, 1961 as Anthony Morris Ridnell) is an American businessman, former international rugby player, and army officer.  He is the founder of TRInternational, Inc., a Chemicals Sales Company.

Early life 

Ridnell was born on 1 January 1961 in New York City. He and his two brothers, David and Jon, played multiple sports. In 1970 his parents moved their family to Sydney, New South Wales, Australia. Ridnell attended Mosman Prep and The Cranbrook School. In 1970, upon arriving at Mosman Prep, he played schoolboy rugby until 1974 when his family returned to Bronxville, NY. He attended Bronxville High School, where he was a standout baseball player, soccer player and wrestler.

West Point 

Recruited to play soccer and baseball at West Point in 1978, Ridnell found himself, like so many others during his plebe year, doing something completely different.  During his junior year he began playing Rugby once again, playing in the back row for over 20 matches on the First XV from 1981 to 1982.

US Army 
Upon graduating from West Point, Ridnell attended the Field Artillery Basic Course in 1982 at Fort Sill, OK. His first station was Schofield Barracks, HI, where he served as a platoon leader and fire support officer. At Schofield Barracks he continued to play rugby, and was selected for the Combined Services Rugby Team at the National Military Championships in 1984. Following the National Military Championships, the Combined Services Rugby Team toured England. In 1985 Ridnell attended the Field Artillery Advanced Course at Fort Sill, and later served as a Field Artillery Battery Commander stationed at Fort Lewis, WA. He left the service in 1988 to pursue a place in The Eagles, the United States national rugby union team.

Rugby career 

In 1985 Ridnell was named to the United States national rugby union team, the Eagles, under coach Ron Mayes.  Earning his first cap as Eagle No. 168, in his first match for Jim Perkins, he started at Blind-Side Flanker (No. 6), against Australia in the 1987 Rugby World Cup. In 1989, he would suffer a knee injury with thoughts of never being able to play again.  He returned to international play at the 1991 Rugby World Cup starting against Italy at No. 8 losing 30-9 at Cross Green, England. Ridnell became an accomplished 7s player leading the pack at every Hong Kong Sevens tournament from 1989 to 1993 under Eagles 7s Coach Emil Signes.  Having established himself at the Canberra, Fiji, and Hong Kong Sevens Tournaments he earned a spot representing the United States in the first Sevens World Cup.

His final international tournament was the 1993 Sevens World Cup helping the United States Earn a 31–0 victory over the Netherlands. Ridnell's final International 15s match came in 1993 against Canada at No. 5-Lock on 19 June 1993.  Ridnell continued international career representing the Eagles on the 7s team until 1994. In total he earned 14 International XVs Caps and 71 Sevens Caps.

Business career 

In 1988 Ridnell left the US Army in pursuit of a career in private industry.  He founded TRInternational Trading Co, Inc. in 1994. In 2005, Tony Ridnell purchased a stake in Chemblend of America, in his entrance to Chemical Manufacturing. From 2000-2008 he served on the Board of Directors for the National Association of Chemical Distributors and in 2006 he joined the Board of Advisors for the Albers School of Business, Seattle University, in 2006. In 2014 TRI International was ranked in the 200 of Chemical Distributors Worldwide and in the top 60 in Latin America by Independent Chemical Information Service with $45.2 Million in Revenue.  TR International has been an A+ rated member of the Better Business Bureau since 2004.

References 

1961 births
Living people
United States international rugby union players
Rugby union number eights